Hyphessobrycon caru is a species of Hyphessobrycon. It belongs to the Rosy-Tetra-species group and was described in 2019. The species name caru refers to the  large area Caru, where the species was found. This area is inhabited by the ethnic groups Guajá and Guajajara.

Description 
It has a brown to black spot on his dorsal fin. Its few, irregular but vertical ordered pigment cells in its shoulder area are an important difference to related characiformes. The males, in contrast to the females, have small bone hooks at their anal and pelvis fin rays.

Species distribution 
The fish has only been found in the upper drainage basin of the Pindaré River, a left tributary of the rio Mearim in the federal state Maranhão in the northeast of Brazil near the Atlantic coast.

References 

Fauna of Brazil 
Characidae 
Fish described in 2019
Taxobox binomials not recognized by IUCN